Club Argentino de Ajedrez was founded on April 17, 1905 in Buenos Aires.

Winners 

{| class="sortable wikitable"
! Year !! Winner
|-
| 1906–1907 || Benito Villegas
|-
| 1908 || Julio Lynch
|-
| 1909 || Alejandro Mom
|-
| 1910 || Rolando Illa
|-
| 1911 || Julio Lynch
|-
| 1912–1919 || Rolando Illa
|-
| 1920–1921 || Julio Lynch
|-
| 1922 || Carlos Portela
|-
| 1923 || Enrique Ibañez
|-
| 1924 || Julio Lynch
|-
| 1925–1928 || Carlos Portela
|-
| 1929–1930 || Julio Lynch
|-
| 1931–1948 || Aaron Schvartzman
|-
| 1949–1951 || Enrique Reinhardt
|-
| 1952 || Luis Piazzini
|-
| 1953 || Oscar Panno
|-
| 1954 || Leonardo Lipiniks
|-
| 1955 || Enrique Reinhardt
|-
| 1956–1957 || Raúl Sanguinetti
|-
| 1958–1962 || Alfredo Esposito
|-
| 1963–1964 || Ruben Rollansky
|-
| 1965–1992 || Oscar Panno
|-
| 1993 || Humberto Borghi
|-
| 1994 || Javier Moreno
|-
| 1995–2006 || Hugo Spangenberg
|-
| 2007 || Sandro Mareco
|}

References
Club Argentino de Ajedrez
El Centenario del Club Argentino de Ajedrez

1905 establishments in Argentina
Chess competitions
Chess in Argentina
Recurring sporting events established in 1905
Sports competitions in Buenos Aires